Natalija Stevanović (née Kostić; , born 25 July 1994) is a Serbian tennis player.

She has won 14 singles and 13 doubles titles on the ITF Women's Circuit. On 18 November 2019, she reached her best singles ranking of world No. 162. On 12 September 2022, she peaked at No. 196 in the WTA doubles rankings. She was officially a member of Serbia Fed Cup team in their World Group quarterfinal tie against Belgium in 2012.

Stevanović is a former junior top-5 player.

She missed the whole of 2015 and the first half of 2016 season due to operation of liver cyst.

She made her WTA Tour main-draw debut in February 2020 at Thailand Open in both singles and doubles, losing in the first round of each.

Grand Slam singles performance timeline

ITF Circuit finals

Singles: 23 (14 titles, 9 runner–ups)

Doubles: 30 (13 titles, 17 runner–ups)

References

External links

 
 
 

1994 births
Living people
Sportspeople from Niš
Serbian female tennis players